Osthouse is a commune in the Bas-Rhin department in Alsace in north-eastern France.

The sole remaining wall of the 1865 synagogue, destroyed by the Nazis, makes a dramatic standing ruin.

See also
 Communes of the Bas-Rhin department

References

Communes of Bas-Rhin
Bas-Rhin communes articles needing translation from French Wikipedia